Diamond Glacier may refer to: 

Diamond Glacier (Antarctica)
Diamond Glacier (British Columbia)
Diamond Glacier (Tanzania) on the summit of Mount Kilimanjaro